John Kasper (born May 13, 1968) is an American former bobsledder. He competed in the four man event at the 1998 Winter Olympics.

References

External links
 

1968 births
Living people
American male bobsledders
Olympic bobsledders of the United States
Bobsledders at the 1998 Winter Olympics
People from Evergreen Park, Illinois